The 1993 World's Strongest Man was the 16th edition of World's Strongest Man and was won by Gary Taylor from the United Kingdom. It was his first title after finishing fifth the previous year. 1991 winner Magnus Ver Magnusson from Iceland was runner up for the second year in a row, and Riku Kiri from Finland finished third. The contest was held in Orange, France.

Events
 The Juggernaut
 Leviathan lift
 Samson's barrow
 Clash of the titans
 Car Carry
 Hercules hold
 The Trojan Wall
 Atlas Stones

Final results

References

External links
 Official site

World's Strongest
World's Strongest Man
1993 in French sport